Kamen is a town in North Rhine-Westphalia, Germany, in the district Unna.

Geography
Kamen is situated at the east end of the Ruhr area, approximately 10 km south-west of Hamm and 25 km north-east of Dortmund.

Neighbouring cities, towns, and municipalities
 Bergkamen
 Hamm
 Bönen
 Unna
 Dortmund
 Lünen

Division of the town
The town of Kamen consists of the following 6 districts:
 Heeren-Werve
 Methler
 Kamen (city centre)
 Rottum
 Derne
 Südkamen

Council of the town
Elections held in May 2014.

 SPD: 22 
 CDU: 10 
 Alliance 90/The Greens:  4 
 The Left: 2 
 FDP: 1 
 FW: 1

Mayor
Hermann Hupe (born 1950) (teacher), was elected mayor in 2003 with 55,1 % of the votes, he was reelected in 2009 and 2014.

Twin towns – sister cities

Kamen is twinned with:

 Ängelholm, Sweden
 Bandırma, Turkey
 Beeskow, Germany
 Eilat, Israel
 Montreuil-Juigné, France
 Sulęcin, Poland
 Unkel, Germany

Transport
Kamen is maybe most known because of the nearby highway crossing, the Kamener Kreuz. The north-south directed A1 meets the east-west directed A2; due to the importance of both highways the crossing is prone for traffic jams.

Sports
The village Kamen-Methler is well known for its football training camps. The German football team prepared themselves for the 1990 World Cup win in Kamen-Methler. During the soccer world championship 2006 in Germany the Spanish football team lived there.

Notable people
Ernst Marcus (1856–1928), judge and philosopher
Erich Weber (1860–1933), general
Wilhelm Middelschulte (1863–1943), organist, composer and teacher
Elmar Altvater (1938–2018), political scientist
Hans-Heinrich Bass (born 1954), economist
Hartmut Weber (born 1960), athlete
Bastian Seidel (born 1975), Australian physician and politician
Frank Fahrenhorst (born 1977), football player and coach

References

External links

 Official site 

Members of the Hanseatic League
Unna (district)